"Let Me Love You" is a song by American singer Mario, released as a single on October 4, 2004, from his second studio album, Turning Point (2004). The song was written by Ne-Yo, Kameron Houff, and Scott Storch, who produced the track. The remix of the song, also produced by Storch, contains rapped verses from Jadakiss and T.I. The song garnered Mario a Grammy Award nomination for Best Male R&B Vocal Performance in 2006 and became a top-10 hit worldwide, reaching number one in the United States, Canada, Germany, the Netherlands, and New Zealand.

In 2008, "Let Me Love You" was ranked at number 45 on Billboards All-Time Top 100 Hot 100 singles during the first 50 years of the chart. It was the eighth most successful single of the decade according to the Billboard Hot 100 Songs of the Decade chart released in December 2009. In 2013, it was ranked at number 53 on Billboards All-Time Top 100 Hot 100 singles during the first 55 years of the chart.

Background and composition
The song was written by Kameron Houff, Ne-Yo, and Scott Storch, who also produced the track. According to Ne-Yo, after he chose to start singing his songs, he regretted giving "Let Me Love You" to Mario and said that he would have kept it for himself. "Let Me Love You" is a moderate R&B ballad in G minor, centered around the progression C minor / G minor / F major. It is written in common time.

Reception

Critical reception
Jon Pareles from The New York Times commented that "Let Me Love You" "looks back to another 1980s blockbuster, lifting its keyboard sound from Tina Turner's 'What's Love Got to Do with It'."

Accolades and nominations
In 2004, "Let Me Love You" was nominated for a Vibe Award for Best R&B Song and two Teen Choice Awards, Choice Love Song and Choice R&B/Rap Track, but it failed to receive any awards. In 2005, it received nominations for Billboard Music Awards, including "Hot 100 Single of the Year", "Hot 100 Airplay Single of the Year", "Hot R&B/Hip-Hop Single of the Year", "Hot R&B/Hip-Hop Airplay Single of the Year, winning in both the R&B categories. It was also nominated for an MTV Europe Music Award for Best R&B Single, a Viewer's Choice award at the BET Awards, Best Single at the MOBO Awards, and Best R&B/Soul Song at the Soul Train Music Awards. In 2006, Mario was nominated for a Grammy Award for Best Male R&B Vocal Performance with "Let Me Love You". He also received an MTV Australia Awards nomination for Best R&B music video for "Let Me Love You".

Commercial performance
"Let Me Love You" debuted on the U.S. Billboard Hot 100 the week of October 23, 2004, at number 97. It also reached number one on the Hot R&B/Hip-Hop Songs chart. Internationally, it reached the number-one position on the singles charts in Germany, the Netherlands, and New Zealand. In the United Kingdom, the song reached number two on the UK Singles Chart (held off the top spot by "(Is This the Way to) Amarillo"), making it Mario's biggest hit to date in the UK. The single also holds the honor of being one of the highest-selling ringtones with 1.6 million downloads.

Music video
The music video was filmed at studios in Brooklyn, New York in September 2004, directed by Little X. The video generally features Mario dancing, alone or with backup dancers, on various sets.

Track listings

US 7-inch single
A. "Let Me Love You" (radio version) – 4:16
B. "How Could You" (radio version) – 3:59

US 12-inch vinyl
A1. "Let Me Love You" (album version) – 4:16
A2. "Let Me Love You" (instrumental) – 4:17
B1. "Let Me Love You" (album version) – 4:16
B2. "Let Me Love You" (acappella) – 4:03

US 12-inch vinyl (remix)
A1. "Let Me Love You" (remix—album version featuring Jadakiss and T.I.) – 4:29
A2. "Let Me Love You" (remix instrumental) – 4:27
B1. "Let Me Love You" (album version) – 4:16
B2. "Let Me Love You" (remix—acappella featuring Jadakiss and T.I.) – 4:02

UK CD1 and European CD single
 "Let Me Love You" (album version) – 4:09
 "Let Me Love You" (MaUVe remix edit) – 4:04

UK CD2
 "Let Me Love You" (album version) – 4:09
 "Let Me Love You" (remix featuring Jadakiss and T.I.) – 4:29
 "Let Me Love You" (MaUVe remix extended) – 7:42
 "Let Me Love You" (video)

UK 12-inch single
A1. "Let Me Love You" (remix featuring Jadakiss and T.I.) – 4:29
A2. "Let Me Love You" (remix instrumental) – 4:17
A3. "Let Me Love You" (remix—acappella featuring Jadakiss and T.I.) – 4:02
B1. "Let Me Love You" (MaUVe remix) – 7:42
B2. "Let Me Love You" (album version) – 4:09

Australian CD single
 "Let Me Love You" (album version) – 4:09
 "Let Me Love You" (remix featuring Jadakiss and T.I.) – 4:29
 "Whiz" – 4:08
 "Let Me Love You" (video)

Credits and personnel
Credits are lifted from the UK CD1 liner notes.

Studio
 Recorded Soundvilla Studios (Miami Beach, Florida)
 Mixed at Larrabee North (North Hollywood, California)

Personnel

 Scott Storch – music and lyrics, production
 Kameron Houff – music and lyrics, recording
 Ne-Yo – music and lyrics (as Shaffer Smith), vocal production (as Nio)
 Mario – vocals
 Mike Tyler – guitar

 Conrad Golding – recording
 Manny Marroquin – mixing
 Alli – art direction
 Marc "Poppa" Baptiste – photography

Charts

Weekly charts

Year-end charts

Decade-end charts

All-time charts

Certifications

!scope="col" colspan="3"| Ringtone
|-

Release history

Anniversary edition

In 2020, Mario announced that he had re-recorded his vocals for the remastered version, celebrating the 15-year anniversary of the song. The anniversary edition was released on February 14, 2020.

Covers
 Dutch producer Dastic sampled the song and released his own tropical house version featuring vocals from singer CADE. The version charted on the Belgian Dance and Ultratip Bubbling Under charts.

Samples
 In 2021, American artists Ghostface Killah and Shaun Wiah samples the song in the track  Let Me Touch Ya.

See also
 List of Dutch Top 40 number-one singles of 2005
 List of European number-one hits of 2005
 List of number-one hits of 2005 (Germany)
 List of number-one singles from the 2000s (New Zealand)
 List of Billboard Hot 100 number-one singles of 2005
 List of Billboard Mainstream Top 40 number-one songs of 2005
 List of number-one R&B singles of 2005 (U.S.)

References

2000s ballads
2004 songs
2004 singles
2005 singles
Mario (singer) songs
J Records singles
Contemporary R&B ballads
Billboard Hot 100 number-one singles
European Hot 100 Singles number-one singles
Number-one singles in Germany
Dutch Top 40 number-one singles
Number-one singles in New Zealand
Song recordings produced by Scott Storch
Songs written by Scott Storch
Songs written by Ne-Yo
Torch songs